The 1921 New York City mayoral election took place on November 8, 1921, resulting in a victory for Democratic Party candidate John Francis Hylan.

Overview 
The major candidates included New York City mayor and Democratic Party candidate John Hylan who stood for re-election, Manhattan borough president and Republican Party candidate Henry Curran, and the Socialist Party candidate Jacob Panken. Hylan was the son of an Irish-Catholic immigrant and affiliated with Tammany Hall machine politics. Curran had run as a coalition candidate for the Republican factions. Panken had run a progressive campaign and gained support from Milwaukee mayor Daniel Hoan, but failed to generate the same level of support as the Socialist candidate from the prior election, Morris Hillquit.

In the primary election for mayor, Henry Curran heavily defeated Fiorello H. La Guardia, president of the board of aldermen.

Results

References 

Mayoral election
New York City
1921
New York City mayoral election